Thomas Clark Ely (born December 14, 1951) in Norwalk, Connecticut, was ordained and consecrated the Tenth Bishop of the Episcopal Diocese of Vermont on April 28, 2001. He retired in 2019.

Biography
He was ordained Deacon and Priest in the Diocese of Connecticut in 1980. A 1975 cum laude graduate of Western Connecticut State University, Bishop Ely received his Master of Divinity degree in 1980 from the University of the South in Sewanee, Tennessee. The University of the South awarded Bishop Ely an honorary Doctorate in 2003.

Prior to being elected to lead the Episcopal Diocese of Vermont, Bishop Ely served as Missioner of the Greater Hartford (Connecticut) Regional Ministry for 10 years and was key to its formation. From 1985 to 1991, he served as Director of Youth Ministry in the Episcopal Diocese of Connecticut and was Executive Director of Camp Washington. From 1980 to 1985 he served as Assistant Missioner of the Middlesex Area Cluster Ministry in Connecticut.

Current professional associations include the Vermont Ecumenical Council, Vermont Interfaith Action, Cristosal Foundation Board of Directors (supporting Human Rights work in El Salvador), and The Episcopal Church Task Force on the Study of Marriage. Ministry areas of special interest and expertise include ministry development, regional ministry, environmental justice, youth ministry, camp and conference center ministry, and youth suicide prevention.

Bishop Ely is President of the Rock Point Board, the Rock Point School Trustees, and a Trustee of the Episcopal Diocese of Vermont. He is a member of Bishops United Against Gun Violence and has served for many years as a Peer Coach in the House of Bishops. In addition to his El Salvador involvement, Bishop Ely's global mission connections include South Sudan, Israel/Palestine, Kids4Peace, and Jerusalem Peacebuilders. Special areas of interest and study are human dignity, peace and reconciliation, economic justice, and LGBTQ issues.

Thomas married Martha Ann (Wiggins) in 1976. They have two daughters and three grandchildren. He enjoys golf, cycling, kayaking, the theatre, and listening to audiobooks while driving.

See also
 List of Episcopal bishops of the United States
 Historical list of the Episcopal bishops of the United States

References

External links
Episcopal Church website biography

Living people
1951 births
People from Norwalk, Connecticut
Western Connecticut State University alumni
Sewanee: The University of the South alumni
Episcopal bishops of North Dakota